For the Record may refer to:

Music 
 For the Record (Alabama album), a 1998 album
 For the Record (Torae album), a 2011 album
 For the Record: The First 10 Years, a 1984 compilation album by David Allan Coe

Television 
 For the Record (American TV series), a television series by Blaze Media
 For the Record (Canadian TV series), a Canadian television drama series
 For the Record with Greta, an American news series

Other uses
For the Record (book), a political memoir by David Cameron
Britney: For the Record, a 2008 television film
YouTube Rewind 2019: For the Record

See also 
 Four the Record, an album by Miranda Lambert
 Off the Record (disambiguation)
 On Record (disambiguation)
 On the Record (disambiguation)
 Record (disambiguation)